Clortermine (Voranil) was developed by Ciba in the 1960s and is an anorectic drug of the amphetamine class. It is the 2-chloro analogue of the better known appetite suppressant phentermine, and is the 2-chloro positional isomer of chlorphentermine. Clortermine produces very low rates of self-administration in animals similarly to chlorphentermine, and as a result it likely does not act on dopamine. Instead, it may act as a serotonin and/or norepinephrine releasing agent.

See also 
 3,4-Dichloroamphetamine
 Cericlamine
 Chlorphentermine
 Cloforex
 Etolorex
 Methylenedioxyphentermine
 Phentermine

References 

Anorectics
Chloroarenes
Monoamine releasing agents
Substituted amphetamines